Thunder Bay Transit is the public transit operator in Thunder Bay, Ontario, Canada. It was formed in 1970, after the amalgamation of the cities of Port Arthur and Fort William and their respective transit agencies. Thunder Bay Transit is a member of the Canadian Urban Transit Association.

Its fleet of 49 buses run on diesel and biodiesel fuels. Thunder Bay Transit carries 3,300,000 passengers annually, or approximately 9,000 passengers daily, and employs 140 people. The company maintains two transit terminals, one at 40 North Water Street in Port Arthur, and the other at City Hall at 500 Donald Street East in Fort William.

Thunder Bay Transit is the first transit agency in Ontario to be 100% handicapped accessible, and the first Canadian transit agency to use the NextBus system with passenger counters, fare box integrations and passenger
information systems.

History 

Public transit in Thunder Bay was first established in 1892. The silver boom had recently ended, destroying Port Arthur's primary economic raison d'être. With businesses and population vanishing, Port Arthur decided after much debate to build a street car line to connect the town with the rail yards in neighbouring Fort William, much to that town's chagrin.

In 1891, the town of Port Arthur was authorized to construct and operate the first municipally owned street railway in Canada. The Port Arthur Street Railway (PASRy) commenced operations in March 1892, and in that same year, McDonald and Company commenced operations of a private street railway in neighbouring Fort William, which connected the Port Arthur Street Railway's southern terminus at Fort William's northern town limits into the downtown core of Fort William. Although Fort William wanted nothing to do with Port Arthur's municipal railway, PASRy gained control of the McDonald and Company line on June 1, 1893, and extended its operations into the town.

In 1907, Port Arthur and Fort William became cities. The Ontario Railway and Municipal Board forced Port Arthur to sell its section of the railway in Fort William to that city on March 11, 1908, and to submit to operation by a joint commission until December 1, 1913, under the name Port Arthur and Fort William Railway. Thereafter, each city ran its own street railway—Port Arthur assumed the name Port Arthur Civic Railway in 1914, and Fort William assumed the name Fort William Street Railway. Port Arthur added two belt lines to its main line in 1913, with the first street cars running on the North Belt Line October 29, 1913.

The Port Arthur Public Utilities Commission which ran the street railway acquired its first 36-passenger bus (painted maroon and cream) in August 1946 manufactured at the Canadian Car and Foundry plant in Fort William. It immediately phased out the Arthur Street railway line, and renamed its system as Port Arthur Transit.. Gasoline-powered buses were introduced in December 1946 to serve the intercity route. Electric trolley buses were introduced on December 15, 1947, the same year that the Fort William Street Railway was renamed the Fort William Transit Company. The trolley buses were manufactured by J. G. Brill and Company at the Canadian Car and Foundry plant in Fort William. The Intercity trolley coach line of each city's system opened in 1947 and was interlined, with operators' coaches serving the entire line in both cities until 1955.

Street railway operations ended in Thunder Bay in 1948. Port Arthur's last three antiquated cars made their final run over the North Belt Line on February 16, 1948 in a driving snowstorm, and Fort William's street cars ceased operations on October 16, 1948. Since January 1, 1970, when Port Arthur and Fort William were amalgamated into the City of Thunder Bay, the system has been known as Thunder Bay Transit. Electric trolley buses were discontinued on September 10, 1972, and the city has since used diesel buses.

Thunder Bay Transit purchased its first low floor buses in 1994, and by March 2007 became the first full-sized transit agency in Ontario to have a fleet that consisted entirely of accessible buses. Later that year, Thunder Bay Transit became the second Canadian transit agency to implement Grey Island Systems GPS/AVL and NextBus system with passenger counters, fare box integrations and passenger information systems.

Fares and passes 

Thunder Bay Transit fares were last increased on July 20, 2020. Exact cash fare on Thunder Bay Transit is $3.00, support persons ride free, as do children under the age of five when accompanied by an adult. Bus tickets can be purchased in groups of 10 for $25.00, and twenty ride punch passes can be purchased for $44.00. Tickets and twenty ride passes are transferable—they can be shared by many people at one time—and twenty ride passes do not expire. A transfer pass can be obtained when boarding with cash, tickets or a twenty ride pass, and allows passengers to change buses up to two times for the price of one fare. Transfer passes have a one-hour time limit and are non-transferable—they can be used only by the person to whom they are issued.

Thunder Bay Transit offers monthly, semester and family/group passes. These passes allow unlimited rides within the time period specified on the face of the card, so that pass holders do not need to use transfers to change buses.

Monthly passes cost $77.50, and discount monthly passes can be purchased for $66.00 by high school students under 18. Monthly passes for children between 6 and 12, seniors over 65 and persons with valid disabled ID cards cost $55.00. Annual senior pass cost is $495.00. Family/Group passes can be purchased for $11.00, allow for unlimited trips for two adults and three children, one adult and four children, or two adults. Proof of age is required, and children must be under the age of 18.

Students at Lakehead University and Confederation College receive a U-Pass as part of their tuition, which allows for unlimited trips during the school year for the person to whom the pass is issued.

Routes 

Thunder Bay Transit operates 17 regular transit routes covering approximately 350 kilometres (220 miles) of city streets. Most bus routes are anchored on one of the city's two main terminals, and several routes have buses travelling in only one direction, which can result in unnecessarily long trips between short distances. Thunder Bay Transit operates two extra routes during rush hour, serving Sir Winston Churchill and Dennis Franklin Cromarty high schools in the Northwood area, and employees of the Bombardier and Abitibi-Bowater plants in the city's southwest end.

Bus frequency 

Peak routes run Monday to Friday between 6:00 am and 6:00 pm, and Saturday between 9:00 am and 6:00 pm. Most peak routes have a frequency of 30 minutes between stops. Some busy routes have a frequency of 15 minutes during rushhour. Non-peak routes run Monday to Saturday between 6:00 pm and 12:40 am, Saturday morning between 6:00 am and 9:00 am, all day Sunday and statutory holidays. Most non-peak routes have a frequency of 40 minutes between stops.

Rural bus service 

Thunder Bay Transit resumed service to rural areas within city limits in spring 2008 as part of a pilot project funded by the city's share of provincial gas tax revenue. Ridership on both routes was well below the municipal guideline of 10 passengers per hour of service.

Service resumed in South Neebing on March 18, after being cancelled in 2004 due to low ridership. The route operated on Tuesday and Thursday, with two runs in the morning and two runs in the afternoon. The route averaged 1 passenger per hour of service, and cost $73 per passenger to operate. The trial cost $19,200, and brought in only $400 in revenue, resulting in a net cost of $18,800. Service to South Neebing ended on November 27.

Service resumed in McIntyre on June 4, after a telephone survey conducted by the city found some demand for transit service in the area, which had bus service in the 1980s and 1990s. The route operated on Wednesday and Saturday, with two runs in the morning and two in the afternoon. The route averaged 0.5 passengers per hour of service, and cost $148 per passenger to operate. The trial cost $15,600, and brought in only $200 in revenue, resulting in a net cost of $15,400. Service to McIntyre ended on November 29.

Interlining 

When buses on certain routes arrive at a transit terminal, they will resume travel on different routes. Interlining allows passengers to travel longer distances without having to change buses. Route 1 Mainline does not interline.

 Interlining at City Hall terminal  Peak routes2 Crosstown and 12 East End at :15 and :453 Airport and 3 Jumbo Gardens at :15 and :453 Northwood and 3 County Park at :00 and :30Non-peak routes3 Airport and 8 James3 Northwood and 3 County Park

 Interlining at Water Street terminal  Peak routes2 Crosstown and 7 Hudson at :00 and :303 County Park and 3 Northwood at :15 and :453 Jumbo Gardens and 3 Airport at :00 and :309 Junot and 11 John at :00 and :30Non-peak routes2 Crosstown and 7 Hudson9 Junot - University and 11 John - Jumbo Gardens

 Interlining elsewhere 8 James and 9 Junot interline at Intercity Shopping Centre between 6:00 am and 1:00 pm, Monday to Friday, and between 9:00 am and 6:00 pm on Saturdays.4 Neebing becomes 6 Mission at Brown and Frederica

Fleet 

Thunder Bay Transit owns a fleet of 49 buses, which consists of 30 Nova Bus LFSs, 8 Orion Bus Industries Orion VIs, 7 New Flyer D40LFs, and 4 Orion Bus Industries Orion VIIs. Three of the buses run on biodiesel, and all are handicapped accessible low floor models. Thunder Bay Transit is the first full-sized transit system in Ontario to have a fleet entirely of low floor buses.

Technology 

Since September 2007, Thunder Bay Transit buses have been using the Grey Island Systems GPS/AVL and NextBus real-time passenger information systems, which uses GPS sensors and electronic maps to track bus movement and devices to measure passenger numbers. The system uses TBayTel's  CDMA wireless network to relay information to the transit office and to electronic signs located at major transit stops to let riders know when their bus will arrive. These electronic signs are located at the Thunder Bay Regional Health Sciences Centre, Lakehead University, Confederation College, Intercity Shopping Centre, and Thunder Bay Transit's two downtown transit terminals, with a seventh sign planned for the Westfort neighbourhood in the city's south end. A test of the system was released on March 17, 2008 and allowed passengers to view arrival times for routes 2 Crosstown, 3 Northwood, 8 James and 9 Junot.

Accessibility 

To accommodate disabled passengers, Thunder Bay Transit buses are wheelchair accessible low-floor models. Low-floor buses are capable of kneeling to street level and have extending ramps which allow wheelchairs to board safely. Thunder Bay Transit buses had 19,175 rides by persons in wheelchairs in 2006, the most per capita in Ontario." Thunder Bay Transit offers a Night Stop service, where buses will allow passengers to disembark at locations between bus stops during night hours due to safety or security concerns.

Facilities 

Thunder Bay Transit operates two bus terminals in the north and south cores of the city. Thunder Bay Transit's head office and bus garage is located at Thunder Bay Transit and Central Maintenance, located at 570 Fort William Road.

City Hall Terminal 
Address: 500 Donald Street East, Fort William
Functions: downtown south core bus terminal; heated waiting area (City Hall lobby).
Platforms: street level on Brodie Street, Donald Street and May Street around the plaza in front of city hall.
Routes: 1 Mainline, 3 Memorial, 4 Neebing, 8 James, 12 East End, 15 Extra, 17 Extra, 18 Chippewa

Water Street Terminal 
Address: 40 North Water Street, Port Arthur
Coordinates: 
Functions: downtown north core bus terminal; heated waiting area
Platforms: 1
Routes: 1 Mainline, 2 Crosstown, 3 Memorial, 7 Hudson, 9 Junot, 11 John, 17 Extra

Transit Garage 
Thunder Bay Transit and Central Maintenance
Address: 570 Fort William Road
Coordinates: 
Functions: main office and vehicle maintenance

Greyhound Bus Depot 
Address: 815 Fort William Road
Coordinates: 
Functions: privately owned bus depot providing intercity Greyhound bus and courier service. 
Routes: accessible by route 1 Mainline
Greyhound Bus Service has been discontinued effective October 31, 2018

Other transfer points 
Other terminals, serving two or more routes, are located at Intercity Shopping Centre, Lakehead University and Thunder Bay Regional Health Sciences Centre, Confederation College. The intersection of Brown Street and Frederica Street in Westfort is a transfer point for routes 1 Mainline, 5 Edward Westfort, 4 Neebing, and 6 Mission.

See also

 Transportation in Thunder Bay, Ontario
 Public transport in Canada

References

Further reading 
 Scollie, F. Brent (1990). The Creation of the Port Arthur Street Railway 1890–95: Canada's First Municipally-owned Street Railway. Thunder Bay Historical Museum Society, Papers and Records, XVIII
 Andreas, Wesley, MA (2007). Moving Forward: Public Transit in Canadian Mid-sized Cities. University of Calgary Department of Geography

External links 
 Thunder Bay Transit Official web site
 Nextbus Stop Selector for Thunder Bay Transit
 History of Transit in Thunder Bay
 Tom's North American Trolleybus Pix -- Thunder Bay / Port Arthur / Fort William
 Drawings and photos of Thunder Bay Transit buses
 HAGI - Accessible Transit Service

Transit agencies in Ontario
Transport in Thunder Bay